Amphisbaena bilabialata is a species of worm lizards found in Brazil.

References

bilabialata
Reptiles described in 1972
Taxa named by Andrew F. Stimson
Endemic fauna of Brazil
Reptiles of Brazil